Federico Dini (born 2 September 2000) is an Italian rower twice world champion at junior level at the World Rowing Junior Championships.

Achievements

References

External links
 

2000 births
Living people
Italian male rowers